Drew Sample (born April 16, 1996) is an American football tight end for the Cincinnati Bengals of the National Football League (NFL). He played college football at Washington and was drafted by the Bengals in the second round of the 2019 NFL Draft.

College career
Sample caught 46 passes for 487 yards and five touchdowns in his four seasons at Washington.  As a senior, he caught 25 passes for 252 yards and three touchdowns, earning him an honorable mention on the All-Pac 12 team.

Statistics

Professional career

Sample was drafted by the Cincinnati Bengals in the second round with the 52nd overall pick in the 2019 NFL Draft. He was placed on injured reserve on December 7, 2019, with an ankle injury. He finished the season with five catches for 30 yards through nine games and two starts.

Sample received significantly more playing time in 2020, due to an early season-ending injury to starting tight end C. J. Uzomah.  He played in all 16 games during the season, and started in 13 of them, catching 40 passes for 349 yards and a touchdown.

In the 2021 season, Sample appeared in all 17 games and recorded 11 receptions for 81 yards.

In Week 2 of the 2022 season, Sample suffered a knee injury and was placed on injured reserve on October 3, 2022.

References

External links
Cincinnati Bengals bio
Washington Huskies bio

1996 births
Living people
Players of American football from Washington (state)
Sportspeople from Bellevue, Washington
American football tight ends
Washington Huskies football players
Cincinnati Bengals players